Bakayev or Bakaev may refer to:
Albert Bakaev (1964–2009), Russian paralympic swimmer
Eduard Bakayev (born 1978), Russian football player 
Khasan Bakayev, Chechen historian
Mikhail Bakayev (born 1987), Russian football player
Ulugbek Bakayev (born 1978), Uzbekistan football player
Zelimkhan Bakayev (born 1996), Russian football player
Zelim Bakaev (born 1992), Russian singer of Chechen origin. Disappeared in 2017.